is a Japanese businessman. He served as the chairman and chief executive officer of Bridgestone from 2012 to 2020.

References

Living people
Hitotsubashi University alumni
University of Chicago Booth School of Business alumni
Japanese chief executives
Year of birth missing (living people)